Methiini is an obsolete tribe of beetles in the subfamily Cerambycinae, now placed in the Xystrocerini.

It contained the following genera:

 Coleomethia
 Cyanomethia
 Methia
 Methicula
 Paratessaropa
 Pseudomethia
 Styloxus
 Tessaropa

References

 
Cerambycinae
Obsolete animal taxa